The 1932 Cincinnati Reds season was a season in American baseball. The team finished eighth and last in the National League with a record of 60–94, 30 games behind the Chicago Cubs.

Offseason 
In December, the Reds purchased outfielder Wally Roettger from the St. Louis Cardinals. Roettger, who began the 1931 season with the Reds before being traded to St. Louis, finished the season with a .321 batting average with a home run and 37 RBI in 89 games split between the two clubs. In three World Series games Roettger hit .286, helping the Cardinals win the 1931 World Series over the Philadelphia Athletics.

On December 2, Cincinnati acquired third baseman Andy High from the St. Louis Cardinals in exchange for outfielder Nick Cullop and cash. High had a .267 average with 19 RBI in 63 games with St. Louis in 1931. His best seasons came in 1924 when he played for the Brooklyn Robins, as High had a .328 batting average with six home runs and 61 RBI in 144 games, finishing in 12th place in National League MVP voting. In the 1931 World Series, High hit .267 in four games, helping the Cardinals to the championship.

The Reds sold infielder Hod Ford to the St. Louis Cardinals in late January. Ford had been with the Reds since 1926, and in 685 games with the club, he hit .256 with five home runs and 215 RBI.

On February 4, Cincinnati purchased infielder George Grantham from the Pittsburgh Pirates. Grantham hit .305 with 10 home runs and 46 RBI in 127 games with the Pirates in 1931. In 1930, Grantham hit .324 with 18 home runs and 99 RBI. Grantham won the 1925 World Series with the Pirates, as they defeated the Washington Senators.

On March 14, the Reds and Brooklyn Dodgers made a big trade. Cincinnati traded away second baseman Tony Cuccinello, third baseman Joe Stripp and catcher Clyde Sukeforth to Brooklyn in exchange for outfielder Babe Herman, third baseman Wally Gilbert and catcher Ernie Lombardi. Herman was coming off of a season in which he hit .313 with 18 home runs, 97 RBI and 17 stolen bases in 151 games. In 1930, Herman hit .393 with 35 home runs and 130 RBI, and stole 18 bases with the Dodgers. In 888 games with Brooklyn, Herman had a .339 batting average with 112 home runs and 594 RBI. Gilbert had a .266 average with 46 RBI in 145 games during the 1931 season, while Lombardi hit .297 with four home runs and 23 RBI in 73 games.

The Reds and St. Louis Cardinals made another deal in April, as Cincinnati traded pitcher Benny Frey, first baseman Harvey Hendrick and cash to St. Louis in exchange for outfielder Chick Hafey. Hafey led the National League with a .349 batting average in 1931, while hitting 16 home runs and earning 95 RBI in 122 games. Hafey won the World Series with the Cardinals in 1926 and 1931.

Regular season 
The Reds had a solid start to the regular season, winning five of their first eight games, to sit in a tie with the Boston Braves for first place in the National League. The Reds then won only three of their next eight games to finish April in third place with a record of 8-8.

The Reds continued to play good baseball into May, and following a 4-3 win over the Philadelphia Phillies on May 9, the Reds had a record of 14-11, remaining in third place, 3.5 games behind the pennant leading Chicago Cubs. On this date, the Reds purchased pitcher Benny Frey from the St. Louis Cardinals. Frey, who pitched for the Reds from 1929-1931 before being purchased by the Cardinals in the off-season, had a record of 0-2 with a 12.00 ERA in two games with St. Louis in 1932.

On May 22, the Reds completed a three game series sweep against the first place Chicago Cubs, to improve their record to 21-17, cutting the Cubs lead to only three games over the third place Reds. Following the series, the Reds slumped to a record of 4-17 in their next 21 games, as the team sank into last place.

On June 5, Cincinnati sold first baseman Mickey Heath to the St. Louis Cardinals, then purchased first baseman Harvey Hendrick from the Cardinals. Hendrick, who was the Reds starting first baseman in 1931, had a .250 average with a home run and five RBI in 28 games with St. Louis. On June 6, the Reds released outfielder Harry Heilmann. Heilmann, who missed the entire 1931 season due to arthritis of the wrist, struggled in 1932, hitting .258 with no home runs and six RBI in 15 games. This marked the end of Heilmann's career, as in 2147 games, he hit .342 with 183 home runs and 1543 RBI, while stealing 111 bases. Heilmann spent the majority of his career with the Detroit Tigers.

Cincinnati would remain in last place for the rest of the season. The club finished the season with a record of 60-94, 30 games behind the pennant winning Chicago Cubs, and 12 games behind the St. Louis Cardinals and New York Giants, who finished in a tie for sixth place. The 60 victories was the Reds highest total since winning 66 games in 1929, and was a two game improvement over the 1931 club. Despite the last place finish, the Reds attendance rose by nearly 100,000 fans over 1931, as Cincinnati drew 356,950, good for fifth in the National League.

Outfielder Babe Herman had an excellent season with Cincinnati, as he led the club with a .326 batting average with 16 home runs and 87 RBI in 148 games. Catcher Ernie Lombardi hit .303 with 11 home runs and 68 RBI in 118 games in his first season with the team. First baseman Harvey Hendrick hit .302 with four home runs and 40 RBI in 94 games after being acquired from the St. Louis Cardinals during the season.

Red Lucas anchored the pitching staff, as in 31 starts, he had a record of 13-17 with a 2.94 ERA in 269.1 innings pitched. Lucas pitched an NL leading 28 complete games. Si Johnson finished the season with a 13-15 record with a 3.27 ERA in 42 games. Johnson struck out a team high 94 batters.

Season standings

Record vs. opponents

Roster

Player stats

Batting

Starters by position 
Note: Pos = Position; G = Games played; AB = At bats; H = Hits; Avg. = Batting average; HR = Home runs; RBI = Runs batted in

Other batters 
Note: G = Games played; AB = At bats; H = Hits; Avg. = Batting average; HR = Home runs; RBI = Runs batted in

Pitching

Starting pitchers 
Note: G = Games pitched; IP = Innings pitched; W = Wins; L = Losses; ERA = Earned run average; SO = Strikeouts

Other pitchers 
Note: G = Games pitched; IP = Innings pitched; W = Wins; L = Losses; ERA = Earned run average; SO = Strikeouts

Relief pitchers 
Note: G = Games pitched; W = Wins; L = Losses; SV = Saves; ERA = Earned run average; SO = Strikeouts

Farm system

References

External links
1932 Cincinnati Reds season at Baseball Reference

Cincinnati Reds seasons
Cincinnati Reds season
Cincinnati Reds